J. Jayasingh Thiyagaraj Natterjee is an Indian lawyer and politician belonging to the All India Anna Dravida Munnetra Kazhagam (AIADMK). He was a former Member of Parliament, representing Thoothukkudi constituency  in the Lok Sabha (the lower house of India's Parliament) from 2014 to 2019.

J.J.T.Natterjee is a native of the Jacobpuram village, which is located in the Radhapuram taluk. He joined the AIADMK in 1984 before M.G R. He was the party's organizing secretary from 2015-2019, now he is the deputy secretary of AIADMK lawyers' wing. He is also an administrative committee member of the Church of South India's Tuticorin-Nazareth Diocese.

In the 2014 Lok Sabha elections, he defeated P. Jegan of Dravida Munnetra Kazhagam by a margin of 1,24,002 votes.

References

Living people
India MPs 2014–2019
Lok Sabha members from Tamil Nadu
All India Anna Dravida Munnetra Kazhagam politicians
1953 births
People from Thoothukudi district